The Sri Sathya Sai Central Trust  (SSSCT), is a registered public charitable Trust founded in 1972, by Sri Sathya Sai Baba. They are  known for charitable and humanitarian work, including drinking water projects,  healthcare and education.

Sri Sathya Sai Institue of Higher Medical Sciences (SSSIHMS) in Puttaparthi, inaugurated in November 1991 by the then Prime Minister of India -  P V Narasimha Rao, is one of the famous hospitals set up by SSSCT.

In 2020, Sri Satya Sai Central Trust was granted Special Consultative status by United Nations Economic and Social Council. In November 2021, the SSSCT was confererred with the YSR Lifetime Achievement Award, by the Andhra Pradesh government for outstanding contribution to public service.

Board of Trustees 

 T. K. K Bhagawat
 K. Chakravarthi
 Dr. Vijay Kelkar,
 Dr V. Mohan
 Ryuko Hira
 S. S. Naganand 
 R. J. Rathnakar

See also 

 Puttaparthi
 Sathya Sai Baba
 Prasanthi Nilayam
 Sri Sathya Sai Institute of Higher Learning
 Sri Sathya Sai University

References 

Non-governmental organizations
Charitable hospitals
Sathya Sai Baba
Organizations established in 1972
Charitable trusts
United Nations Economic and Social Council
Water supply and sanitation in India
Rural development organisations in India